The iRobot Warrior (also described as the Warrior 700 or X700) is an unmanned robotic platform from  iRobot Corporation.  The 285 lb (129 kg) robot can traverse land at up to 9.3 mph (15 km/h) and is capable of carrying up to 500 lb (227 kg), including 150 lb (68 kg) in its manipulator.  Able to climb steps and slopes at up to 45°, the next generation of remote control robotic vehicles is bigger, faster, and more capable than their smaller counterparts.  Initial intended uses are Explosive Ordnance Disposal, route-clearance, surveillance, enhanced security measures, scouting, reconnaissance, casualty extraction, firefighting, manipulating and welding.

iRobot has teamed up with Metal Storm to mount an electronically controlled firing system on a Warrior capable of firing up to 16 rounds per second.

In c. 2008, iRobot announced that it received a $3.75 million contract from Army Tank-Automotive Research, Development and Engineering Center for research and development.

References

External links
 iRobot Corporation: Warrior
 Warrior Specifications
 The iRobot Warrior - Engineering TV

Unmanned ground vehicles
IRobot
Unmanned ground combat vehicles
Tracked robots
2000s robots
Mine warfare countermeasures